Daniel Frank (born 21 March 1994) is an Italian professional ice hockey player. He is currently playing with the HC Bolzano in the ICE Hockey League (ICEHL).

Since 2015 he is also member of the Italy men's national ice hockey team.

References

External links

Living people
1994 births
Bolzano HC players
Italian ice hockey forwards
Germanophone Italian people
Sportspeople from Merano
Expatriate ice hockey players in Austria
Italian expatriate ice hockey people
Italian expatriate sportspeople in Austria
Expatriate ice hockey players in Germany
Italian expatriate sportspeople in Germany